Each year the Wisconsin Mr. Basketball award is given to the person chosen as the best high school boys basketball player in the U.S. state of Wisconsin, in the United States.

The award has been given since 1982. Winners are chosen by the Wisconsin Basketball Coaches Association at the time of their annual All-State selections. Most of the award winners have gone on to play at the highest levels of college basketball, and some have gone on to play in the National Basketball Association.

Voting is done by a panel of retired WBCA members that select the winner after receiving nomination information and reviewing film on each candidate.

Only those in the senior class are eligible to win in Wisconsin.

Annual award winners

See also
Wisconsin Miss Basketball Award

External links
List of Mr. Basketball Winners from Wisconsin

References

Mr. and Miss Basketball awards
Awards established in 1981
Lists of people from Wisconsin
Mr. Basketball